Ali Rana Tarhan (1883 – 25 March 1956) was a Turkish politician, and a member of the Republican People's Party.

Biography 

He was born in İstanbul in 1883. After graduating from Galatasaray High School, he travelled to Belgium and Germany to study communication (then known as PTT-profession). He joined the Republican People's Party (CHP) and, in 1927 he was elected as an MP. In the 7th, 8th, 9th, 10th, 11th and 12th government of Turkey he was always the Minister of Customs and Trade between 1 March 1935– 26 May 1939. In 1939, he joined a group of MP s in the party to form a semi independent political group in the party which would act as an opposition. He was the acting speaker of the group. Thus he left his seat in the cabinet.
After his party lost the elections in 1950 he served in the board of directors of İşbank.

He died in İstanbul on March 25, 1956, and was buried the next day in the family grave at the Küplüce Cemetery in Beylerbeyi.

References

1883 births
1956 deaths
Politicians from Istanbul
Galatasaray High School alumni
Ministers of Customs and Trade of Turkey
Republican People's Party (Turkey) politicians
Members of the 7th government of Turkey
Members of the 8th government of Turkey
Members of the 9th government of Turkey
Members of the 10th government of Turkey
Members of the 11th government of Turkey
Members of the 12th government of Turkey
Members of the 3rd Parliament of Turkey
Members of the 4th Parliament of Turkey
Members of the 5th Parliament of Turkey
Members of the 6th Parliament of Turkey